Eleonora Requena (born 1968) is a Venezuelan poet.

Education and career 
Requena studied literature at the Universidad Católica Andrés Bello in Caracas.

She has published the poem compilations Sed (Eclepsidra, 1998), mandados (La Liebre Libre, 2000, Es de día (El Pez Soluble, 2004), La Noche y sus agüeros (El Pez Soluble, 2007) and Ética del aire (bid & co. editor, 2008). 

She has participated in the literary workshops of the Latin American Studies Center Rómulo Gallegos (Celarg)), where she published her collection Voces Nuevas (1995-1997), and her work has been published in several critical studies and anthologies both nationally and abroad.

Awards 
With her poem mandados, Requena was awarded with the V Latin American Biennial of Poetry José Rafael Pocaterra Award in 2000, while with La Noche y sus agüeros she received the Italy Poetry Award in 2007 in the contest «Mediterranean and Caribbean», promoted by the Italian Institute of Culture of Venezuela and the University of Bologna Center for Contemporary Poetry.

Works 

 Sed (Eclepsidra, 1998)
 mandados (La Liebre Libre, 2000)
 Es de día (El Pez Soluble, 2004)
 La Noche y sus agüeros (El Pez Soluble, 2007)
 Ética del aire (bid & co. editor, 2008)
 Nido de tordo (Kalathos, 2015)
 Textos por fuera (El taller blanco, 2020)

References 

1968 births
Living people
Venezuelan women poets
Andrés Bello Catholic University alumni
People from Caracas